The Mmabatho People's Party (MPP) was a political party in South West Africa, today's Namibia. It was formed in 1986 after a split in the Tshwana communal party, Seoposengwe Party. The MPP was led by Michael Simana.

References

Defunct political parties in Namibia
Political parties established in 1986
1986 establishments in South West Africa